The Indian 2000-rupee banknote (₹2000) is a denomination of the Indian rupee. It was released by the Reserve Bank of India (RBI) on 8 November 2016 after the demonetisation of ₹500 and ₹1000 banknotes and has been in circulation since 10 November 2016. It is a part of the Mahatma Gandhi New Series of banknotes with a completely new design.

This is the highest currency note printed by RBI that is in active circulation, ever since the 1,000 rupee note was demonetised in November 2016. Before the official announcement by RBI, the media reported that ₹2000 notes had been printed from the currency printing press in Mysuru by the end of October 2016. Post 2016 Indian banknote demonetisation, seven new currency notes have been announced by the Reserve Bank of India-- ₹2,000, ₹500, ₹200, ₹100, ₹50, ₹20, and ₹10.

According to the RBI data, there were 3,285 million pieces of ₹2000 notes in circulation at end-March 2017. A year after (on March 31, 2018), there was only a marginal increase in the number at 3,363 million pieces. Of the total currency in circulation amounting to ₹18,037 billion at end-March 2018, ₹2000 notes accounted for 37.3 percent, down from 50.2 percent at end-March 2017. The share has come down to 22.6 per cent at end-March 2020.

The ₹2,000 note was created as a quick fix, to have enough circulation of currency. With lower denominations available in circulation, the Indian government and the RBI has rolled back ₹2,000 notes from circulation.

Under the pretense that the ₹2000 note is being used for hoarding and tax evasion, RBI has stopped the printing of banknotes of ₹2000 denomination and no new notes of this denomination were printed during the 2019-20 fiscal year.

Design
The new 2000 banknote is a 66 mm × 166 mm Magenta coloured note, with the obverse side featuring a portrait of Mahatma Gandhi, the Ashoka Pillar Emblem, and the signature of Reserve Bank of India Governor. It has Braille print on it, to assist the visually challenged in identifying the currency. The reverse side features a motif of the Mangalyaan, representing India's first interplanetary space mission, and the logo and tag line for Swachh Bharat Abhiyan.

Security features

The 2000 banknotes has multiple security features, listed below:

See-through registration device with denominational numeral ₹2000
Latent image with denominational numeral ₹2000
Denominational numeral २००० rendered in Devnagari script
Micro letters 'RBI' and '2000' on the left side of the banknote
Windowed security thread with inscriptions 'भारत', RBI, and ₹2000 on banknotes, with a colour shift. The thread colour changes from green to blue when the note is tilted 
Guarantee Clause, the Governor’s signature with the Promise Clause, and the RBI's emblem on the right side
Denominational numeral with Rupee Symbol, 2000 in colour changing ink (green to blue) on bottom right
Ashoka Pillar emblem on the right Mahatma Gandhi portrait and electrotype (2000) watermarks
Number panel with numerals growing from small to big on the top left side and bottom right side.
For the visually impaired Intaglio (raised printing) of Mahatma Gandhi portrait, Ashoka Pillar emblem, bleed lines and identity mark
Horizontal rectangle with 2000 in raised print on the right
Seven angular bleed lines on left and right side in raised print (obverse)
Year of printing of the note on the left (reverse)

Languages
Like other Indian rupee banknotes, the 2000 banknote has its amount written in 17+1 languages (Braille language added on new currency notes for visually impaired). On the obverse, the denomination is written in English and Hindi. On the reverse is a language panel which displays the denomination of the note in 15 of the 22 official languages of India. The languages are displayed in alphabetical order. Languages included on the panel are Assamese, Bengali, Gujarati, Kannada, Kashmiri, Konkani, Malayalam, Marathi, Nepali, Odia, Punjabi, Sanskrit, Tamil, Telugu, Urdu, and Braille.

See also

Mahatma Gandhi New Series
Indian 500 and 1000 rupee note demonetisation
Indian 500-rupee note
Indian 200-rupee note
Indian rupee

References
 

Banknotes of India
Rupee
Two-thousand-base-unit banknotes
Currencies introduced in 2016